Trampolining or trampoline gymnastics is a competitive Olympic sport in which athletes perform acrobatics while bouncing on a trampoline. In competition, these can include simple jumps in the straight, pike, tuck, or straddle position to more complex combinations of forward and/or backward somersaults and twists. Scoring is based on the difficulty and on the total seconds spent in the air. Points are deducted for bad form and horizontal displacement from the center of the bed.

Outside of the Olympics, competitions are referred to as gym sport, trampoline gymnastics, or gymnastics, which includes the events of trampoline, synchronised trampoline, double mini trampoline and tumbling.

Origins
In the early 1930s, George Nissen observed trapeze artistes performing tricks when bouncing off the safety net. He made the first modern trampoline in his garage to reproduce this on a smaller scale and used it to help with his diving and tumbling activities. He formed a company to build trampolines for sale and used a variant of the Spanish word trampolín (diving board) as a trademark. He used the trampoline to entertain audiences and also let them participate in his demonstrations as part of his marketing strategy.  This was the beginning of a new sport.

In the United States, trampolining was quickly introduced into school physical education programs and was also used in private entertainment centers. However, following a number of injuries and lawsuits caused by insufficient supervision and inadequate training, trampolining is now mostly conducted in specialist gyms with certified trainers. This has caused a large reduction in the number of competitive athletes in the United States and a consequent decline from the earlier American prominence in the sport. Elsewhere in the world the sport was most strongly adopted in Europe and the former Soviet Union. Since trampolining became an Olympic sport in 2000, many more countries have started developing programs.

Basic landing positions

Competitive trampolining routines consist of combinations of 10 contacts with the trampoline bed combining varying rotations, twists and shapes with take-off and landing in one of four positions:

 Feet
 Seat
 Front
 Back

A routine must always start and finish on feet. In addition to the 10 contacts with the bed in a routine, competitors must start their routine within 60 seconds after presenting to the judges. They are also permitted up to one "out bounce", a straight jump to control their height at the end of a routine, before sticking the landing. The trampolinist must stop completely—this means that the bed must stop moving as well—and they have to hold still for a count of 3 seconds before moving.

Basic shapes
In competitions, moves must usually be performed in one of the following 3 basic shapes:

A fourth 'shape', known as 'puck' because it appears to be a hybrid of pike and tuck, is often used in multiple twisting somersaults—it is typically used in place of a 'tuck' and in the competition would normally be judged as an open tuck shape.

A straddle or straddled pike is a variant of a pike with arms and legs spread wide and is only recognized as a move as a shaped jump and not in any somersault moves.

Rotation is performed about the body's longitudinal and lateral axes, producing twists and somersaults respectively.  Twists are done in multiples of a half and somersaults in multiples of a quarter.   For example, a barani ball out move consists of a take-off from the back followed by a tucked 1¼  front somersault combined with a ½  twist, to land on feet.  Rotation around the dorso-ventral axis is also possible (producing side-somersaults and "turntables"), but these are not generally considered to be valid moves within competitions and carry no 'tariff' for difficulty.

Trampoline skills can be written in FIG (Federation Internationale de Gymnastique) shorthand. FIG shorthand consists of one digit signifying the number of quarter rotations, followed by digits representing the number of half twists in each somersault, and a symbol representing the position of the skill. "/" represents a straight position, "<" represents a pike position, and "ο" represents a tuck position. For example, 42/ is a back somersault with a full twist in the straight position, 800ο is a double back somersault with no twists in the tuck position, and 821/ is a double somersault that has a full twist in the first full somersault and a half twist in the second full somersault while remaining in a straight position.

Competition

Individual

The first individual trampolining competitions were held in colleges and schools in the US and then in Europe.  In the early years of competition there was no defined format with performers often completing lengthy routines and even remounting if falling off partway through. Gradually competitions became more codified such that by the 1950s the 10-bounce routine was the norm thereby paving the way for the first World Championships which were organised by Ted Blake of Nissen, and held in London in 1964. The first World Champions were both American, Dan Millman and Judy Wills Cline. Kurt Baechler of Switzerland and Ted Blake of England were the European pioneers and the first ever televised National Championships were held in England in 1958.

Soon after the first World Championships, an inaugural meeting of prominent trampolinists was held in Frankfurt to explore the formation of an International Trampoline Federation. In 1965 in Twickenham, the Federation was formally recognised as the International Governing Body for the sport. In 1969, the first European Championship was held in Paris and Paul Luxon of London was the winner at the age of 18. The ladies winner was Ute Czech from Germany. From that time until 2010, European and World Championships have taken place in alternate years—the European in the odd and the World in the even. Now the World Championships are held annually.

In 1973, Ted Blake organised the first World Age Group Competition (WAG) in the newly opened Picketts Lock Sports Centre; these now run alongside the World Championships.  Blake also used the first WAG as an opportunity to organise a World Trampoline Safety Conference which was held in the Bloomsbury Hotel, London, in order to codify safety concerns.  There is also a World Cup circuit of international competitions which involves a number of competitions every year. There are also international matches between teams from several countries.

At first the Americans were successful at World Championship level, but soon European competitors began to dominate the sport and for a number of years, athletes from countries that made up the former Soviet Union have often dominated the sport. Germany and France have been the other strong nations in trampolining and the first four ranking places in World Trampolining used to go to USSR, France, Britain and Germany. In recent years, Canada has also produced Olympic medalists and World champions due in large part to contributions made to the sport by Dave Ross.  Ross pioneered the sport in Canada almost 30 years ago and has consistently produced Olympic and World Cup athletes and champions. Since trampolining became an Olympic sport, China has also made a very successful effort to develop world-class trampoline gymnasts, their first major success was in the 2007 Men's World Championship and later in both Men's and Women's gold medals and a bronze in the 2008 Olympic Games held in Beijing. Since then they have won both World Championships and several Olympic medals.

Synchronized
In synchronized trampolining, two athletes perform exactly the same routine of ten skills at the same time on two adjacent trampolines. Each athlete is scored separately by a pair of judges for their form in the same manner as for individual competitions. Additional judges score the pair for synchronization. Fewer points are deducted for lack of synchronization if the pair are bouncing at the same height at the same time. The degree of difficulty of the routine is determined in the same way as for individual trampoline routines and the points added to the score to determine the winner.

Double mini

A double mini-trampoline is smaller than a regulation competition trampoline. It has a sloped end and a flat bed. The gymnasts run up and jump onto the sloping end and then jump onto the flat part before dismounting onto a mat. Skills are performed during the jumps or as they dismount.

A double mini-trampoline competition consists of two types of pass. In the one, which is known as a mounter pass, the athlete performs one skill in the jump from the sloping end to the flat bed and a second skill as they dismount from the flat bed to the landing mat. In the second, which is known as a spotter pass, the athlete does a straight jump from the sloping end to the flat bed to gain height, then after landing on the flat, performs the first skill, then after landing on the flat a second time, performs a second skill as they dismount. These skills are similar to those performed on a regular trampoline except that there is forward movement along the trampoline.

The form and difficulty are judged in a similar manner as for trampolining but there are additional deductions for failing to land cleanly (without stepping) or landing outside a designated area on the mat.

Tumbling 

Tumbling gymnastics is a further discipline of gymnastics competed at national and international events, usually alongside trampoline events. Instead of a sprung trampoline, competitors do a single, long complex tumbling and somersaulting combination along a straight, sprung runway, leading to a high final somersault onto a landing mat. The skills involved are very similar to those used in floor exercise or vault routines in artistic gymnastics, but with an extra emphasis on continuity and directional accuracy than in either of those events.

Tumbling is not an Olympic Games event, but has been held as part of the european Games, as well as individual World and continental championships.

Format
The International Trampoline Federation became part of the Fédération Internationale de Gymnastique in 1999. FIG is now the international governing body for the sport which is paired with tumbling as the skill sets overlap. International competitions are run under the rules of FIG. Individual national gymnastics organizations can make local variations to the rules in matters such as the compulsory and optional routines and number of rounds for national and local competitions.

As part of the agreement to merge FIT with FIG, individual trampolining was accepted into the Summer Olympic Games for 2000 as an additional gymnastic sport.

The currently accepted basic format for individual trampoline competitions usually consists of two or three routines, one of which may involve a compulsory set of skills. The skills consist of various combinations of somersaults, shaped bounces, body landings and twists performed in various body positions such as the tuck, pike or straight position.

The routines are performed on a standard 14-foot-by-7-foot regulation-sized trampoline with a central marker. Each routine consists of the athlete performing ten different skills starting and finishing on the feet.

Scoring

The routine is marked out of 10 by five judges with deductions for incomplete moves or poor form. Usually the highest and lowest scores are discarded. Additional points can be added depending on the difficulty of the skills being performed. The degree of difficulty (DD or tariff) is calculated by adding a factor for each half turn (or twist) or quarter somersault. Difficulty is important in a routine, however, there are differences in opinion between various coaches whether it is better to focus on increasing the difficulty of routines given that this usually results in a reduced form score or to focus on improving execution scores by displaying better form in an easier routine.

In senior level competitions, a "Time of Flight" (ToF) score was added to the overall score from 2010. This  benefits athletes who can maintain greater height during their routines. "Time of Flight" is the time spent in the air from the moment the athlete leaves the mat until the time they make contact again and is measured with electronic timing equipment. The score given is the sum the time in seconds of all completed jumps. This is now mainly in all competitions, including Club, County and Regional,  as it is a key factor in judging

In 2017, the method of determining the horizontal displacement from the centre was changed, new markings were added to the bed and zones set up with deductions based on the distance from the centre of the trampoline bed. The score is determined by a deduction which is the sum of all the landing zone deductions subtracted from 10. The displacement is measured electronically where the equipment is available, or else by two judges observing the landing zones.

The total score is a combination of the degree of difficulty (DD) performed plus the total Time of Flight (ToF) minus standardized deductions for poor form and mistakes and the horizontal displacement.

Score records
The official world record DD for men at a FIG sanctioned event is 18.00, achieved by Jason Burnett of Canada on April 30, 2010, at the Pacific Rim Championships in Melbourne, Australia.  He beat his own world record of 17.50 that he had achieved on April 2, 2007, at the Lake Placid, New York Trampoline World Cup. Burnett beat the twenty-year-old record of 17.00 by Igor Gelimbatovsky (USSR, 1986) and Daniel Neale (GBR, 1999). The top competitors usually perform routines with a DD of 16.5 or greater. In 2009 Jason Burnett completed a training routine with a DD of 20.6 at Skyriders Trampoline Place in Canada.
The women's world record DD is 16.20 by Samantha Smith (CAN). The top women competitors usually compete routines with a DD greater than 14.50.
The women's synchronised trampoline pair of Karen Cockburn and Rosannagh Maclennan also of Canada completed a new world record DD of 14.20 at the same April 2, 2007 Lake Placid World Cup.

Safety
Although trampoline competitors are highly trained, they are also attempting to perform complex manoeuvres which could lead to accidents and falls. Trampolines used in competitions have their springs covered in pads to reduce the chance of injury when landing off the bed. They also have padded end decks, which are the locations that athletes are most likely to fall off the trampoline. The rules for international competitions (updated by FIG in 2006) also require 200mm thick mats on the floor for 2 metres around each trampoline and for there to be four spotters whose task it is to attempt to catch or reduce the impact of an athlete falling off the side of the trampoline bed. The floor matting rules are typically adopted by national bodies but not always in full; for example in the UK the requirement for National & Regional competition is still 2m but only of 20–25mm matting.

Teenage trampoline athletes are at higher risk of injury with higher training loads.

Among Olympic athletes at the 2008, 2012, and 2016 games, the injury rate for trampoline gymnasts was about half that for artistic gymnasts.

References

Sources
 Some original material extracted from Bounce 2000 information booklet: David Allen, Brisbane, Queensland Australia.

External links
 Everything about trampolining and acrobatic sports
 Important Trampolining Safety Tips

 
Gymnastics
Individual sports
Summer Olympic disciplines
Acrobatic sports
Jumping sports